Villa R is an oil on carton painting from 1919 by the Swiss-born German artist Paul Klee.

Description
The work depicts a white villa standing beside a red road winding into the mountains beyond. A full moon is shining yellow overhead. In the foreground is a large capital letter R which appears to be a part of the landscape. The red road forms a diagonal across the painting and a row of green shapes, including the green letter R, form a second intersecting diagonal. The villa is positioned at the intersection.

Title
The significance of the letter R is not revealed in the painting's title, but is believed to stand for Rosa. Klee had seen the Villa Rosa in the early 1900s on his travels through Italy, accompanied by Goethe's travel diary Italian Journey.

Degenerate Art
In 1939 the painting was confiscated from an art gallery in Frankfurt-am-Main by the Nazis as "degenerate art" and sent with other confiscated works in the Degenerate Art auction by the Fischer gallery in the Grand Hotel National in Lucerne, Switzerland. There it was sold to its current owners, the Kunstmuseum Basel.

See also
List of works by Paul Klee

References

External links

1919 paintings
Paintings by Paul Klee
Paintings in the collection of the Kunstmuseum Basel